Sherbit Castle is a historical castle located in Ahar County in East Azerbaijan Province. The longevity of this fortress dates back to the Parthian Empire.

References 

Castles in Iran
Parthian castles